Delias woodi  is a species of pierine butterfly  endemic to Mindanao in the Philippines.

The wingspan is 60–65 mm.

Subspecies
Delias woodi woodi (Mt. Apo, Mindanao)
Delias woodi colini Schroder, 1977 (Mt. Kitanlad, Mindanao)
Delias woodi tboli Schroder & Treadaway, 1984 (Mt. Parket, Mindanao)

Taxonomy
It may be a form of Delias ottonia.

References

External links
images representing Delias woodi  at Encyclopedia of Life

woodi
Butterflies of Asia
Endemic fauna of the Philippines
Lepidoptera of the Philippines
Fauna of Mindanao
Butterflies described in 1928
Taxa named by George Talbot (entomologist)